Correio was a  Portuguese-language newspaper published in Luxembourg.  It was published by Editpress.

Footnotes

External links
  Correio official website

Weekly newspapers published in Luxembourg
1999 establishments in Luxembourg
Publications established in 1999
Portuguese-language newspapers
Portuguese diaspora in Europe